The Nepal women's national 3x3 team is a national basketball team of Nepal, administered by the Nepal Basketball Association.
It represents the country in international 3x3 (3 against 3) women's basketball competitions.

See also
Nepal women's national basketball team
Nepal men's national 3x3 team

References

Basketball in Nepal
Basketball teams in Nepal
Women's national 3x3 basketball teams
Basketball